Hopewell Academy was a Baptist Latin grammar preparatory school in Hopewell, New Jersey that operated between 1756 and 1767. The academy is noted as the first Baptist educational establishment in the American Colonies. The school was the forerunner of Brown University, with Hopewell alumni James Manning and Hezekiah Smith both playing major roles in the establishment and early administration of the college.

History
In 1756, Reverend Isaac Eaton founded Hopewell Academy in Hopewell, Province of New Jersey "for the education of youth for the ministry." The academy was one of a number established on the model pioneered by the Presbyterian Log College in the Province of Pennsylvania.

The academy was financed by the Philadelphia Baptist Association and the Charleston Baptist Association, who appointed trustees to oversee its affairs

The school operated out of a parsonage house at 19 W. Broad St. The  structure was remodeled in the late 19th century and further modernized in the 20th century. The school closed in 1767.

Relationship with Brown University 
Two alumni of the school played major role in the establishment early administration of Brown University. Minister Hezekiah Smith was an early supporter of the university while James Manning served as the college's first president.

Hopewell Academy's relationship with Brown is analogous to that of the Log College with Princeton University.

Gallery

Alumni
Hezekiah Smith, early supporter of Brown University
James Manning (1738–1791), first president of Brown University, minister of the First Baptist Church in America

References

See also 

 Baptists in the United States
 History of Brown University

Defunct schools in New Jersey